Undertow may refer to:

 Undertow (water waves), a strong undercurrent flowing in a different direction from the surface current

Film and television 
 The Undertow, a 1916 silent drama
 The Undertow (1915 film), a short silent film directed by Jack Harvey
 Undertow (1930 film), a romantic drama starring Mary Nolan
 Undertow (1949 film), a crime thriller directed by William Castle
 Undertow (1996 film), a film directed by Eric Red
 Undertow (2004 film), a thriller directed by David Gordon Green
 Undertow (2009 film), a Peruvian film
 "Undertow" (CHiPs), an episode of CHiPs
 "Undertow" (The Killing), an episode of The Killing
 "Undertow" (Motive), an episode of Motive
 "Undertow" (The Wire), an episode of The Wire
 "The Undertow" (The O.C.), an episode of The O.C.

Music
 Undertow (band), a 1990s American punk music group
 Undertow Music, an American independent artists' collective
 The Undertow Orchestra, an indie rock "supergroup" associated with the collective
 Undertow, a composition for concert band by John Mackey

Albums 
 Undertow (Blind Idiot God album), 1989
 Undertow (Drenge album), 2015
 Undertow (Tool album), or the title song
 Undertow (Mark Seymour album), 2011
 Undertow, by Firefall
 Undertow, by Sidsel Endresen
 Undertow, by Stan Meissner

Songs 
 "Undertow" (song), a 2010 song by Warpaint
 "Undertow", by Ane Brun from It All Starts with One
 "Undertow", by Bowling For Soup Bowling for Soup Goes to the Movies
 "Undertow", by Chroma Key from Dead Air for Radios
 "Undertow", by Genesis from ...And Then There Were Three...
 "Undertow", by Ivy from Long Distance
 "Undertow", by James LaBrie from Impermanent Resonance
 "Undertow", by Kim Carnes from Voyeur
 "The Undertow", by Lamb of God from Resolution
 "Undertow", by Leonard Cohen from Dear Heather
 "Undertow", by Lisa Hannigan from At Swim
 "Undertow", by Lush from Split
 "Undertow", by Marty Friedman from Inferno
 "Undertow", by Molotov from Apocalypshit
 "Undertow", by Mr. Big from What If...
 "Undertow", by Pain of Salvation from Remedy Lane
 "Undertow", by Pet Shop Boys from Super
 "Undertow", by R.E.M. from New Adventures in Hi-Fi
 "The Undertow", by Red Fang from Murder the Mountains
 "Undertow", by Sara Bareilles from Careful Confessions
 "Undertow", by Stars from Sad Robots
 "Undertow", by Suzanne Vega from Suzanne Vega
 "Undertow", by Timbaland from Shock Value II
 "Undertow", by Tool from Undertow (Tool album)
 "Undertow", by Ugly Kid Joe from Motel California
 "Undertow", by Warrant from Ultraphobic

Other uses 
 Undertow (roller coaster), a roller coaster at Santa Cruz Beach Boardwalk, California
 Undertow (video game), on Xbox Live Arcade
 Undertow, a novel by Elizabeth Bear
 Undertow, an action figure in the toy series G.I. Joe: A Real American Hero